Viktor Knyazev (born 2 March 1925) was a Soviet athlete. He competed in the men's pole vault at the 1952 Summer Olympics.

References

External links
  

1925 births
Possibly living people
Athletes (track and field) at the 1952 Summer Olympics
Soviet male pole vaulters
Olympic athletes of the Soviet Union
Place of birth missing